Lukavica Rijeka is a village in the municipalities of Doboj (Republika Srpska) and Doboj East, Bosnia and Herzegovina.

Demographics 
According to the 2013 census, its population was 1,037, all of them living in the Doboj East part, thus none in Doboj municipality.

References

Villages in the Federation of Bosnia and Herzegovina
Populated places in Doboj Istok
Populated places in Doboj